Andrew J. Lewis may refer to:
 Andrew J. Lewis (comics), British writer
 Andrew J. Lewis (politician) (born 1989/1990), American politician